Oskar Ekman is a Swedish music manager, label owner and former agent. Known primarily for co-founding independent label YEAR0001 alongside Emilio Fagone, Ekman also played in several bands including Nine and Last Days of April. Prior to founding YEAR0001, he served as manager to Swedish pop act Lorentz.

Career

2004 - 2016
From 2004 to 2013, Ekman worked as an agent for Swedish booking companies Luger and Blixten. After exiting his role at Blixten, he managed Swedish artist Lorentz during the production and release of his 2014 album, Kärlekslåtar. The album would go on to be nominated for a Swedish Grammis and was received positively by critics. While managing Lorentz, he shared an office with YEAR0001 co-founder Emilio Fagone, prompting their decision to go into business together.

2016 - Present
Since 2016, Ekman has worked with several internationally acclaimed Swedish artists, including Yung Lean, Dungen and Viagra Boys, primarily as a manager.

The formation of Viagra Boys was assisted by Ekman, who booked them their first studio session with Daniel Fagerström, a former member of Swedish punk band The Skull Defects alongside Jean-Louis Huhta.

In addition to his work at YEAR0001, Ekman has worked with several artists in a variety of capacities, notably as an A&R for Swedish rapper Henok Achido during the recording of the Grammis-nominated album Bror Utan Sol: Bland Rök Och Stearin.

in 2016, Ekman sold his car in order to purchase Robotberget studios from Swedish band Miike Snow

He was present during the shooting incident that occurred outside of a 2016 Yung Lean show in Pittsburgh.

Discography

References

Swedish music managers
Swedish musicians
1986 births
Living people